The 1904 Missouri gubernatorial election was held on November 8, 1904 and resulted in a victory for the Democratic nominee, Joseph W. Folk, over the Republican candidate, former Mayor of St. Louis Cyrus Walbridge, and several other candidates representing minor parties. Folk defeated Harry B. Hawes and Kansas City Mayor James A. Reed for the Democratic nomination.

Results

References

Missouri
1904
Gubernatorial
November 1904 events